Joaquín Sobrino Martínez (born 22 June 1982 in Posada de Llanes) is a Spanish former professional cyclist, who rode professionally between 2007 and 2016.

Major results

2005
 Tour of Galicia
1st Stages 3 & 5
2008
 1st Stage 2 Vuelta a Navarra
 1st Stage 2 Vuelta Mexico Telmex
 10th Circuito de Getxo
2009
 1st Stage 1 Vuelta a Castilla y León
 5th Circuito de Getxo
 10th Trofeo Cala Millor
2010
 1st Stage 3a Vuelta a Asturias
 10th Circuito de Getxo
2011
 5th Flèche d'Emeraude
 7th Châteauroux Classic
2012
 3rd Overall Tour d'Algérie
1st Points classification
1st Stage 2
 5th Overall Okolo Jižních Čech
1st Stage 3
 10th Circuit d'Alger
2013
 1st Stage 4 Five Rings of Moscow
 7th Overall Tour d'Algérie
 7th Grand Prix of Moscow
 9th Mayor Cup
2014
 4th Ronde van Midden-Nederland

References

External links

1982 births
Living people
Spanish male cyclists
People from Llanes
Cyclists from Asturias